Leyna Juliet Weber is an American actress, author and screenwriter.

Filmography

Documentary narration
Assignment Discovery (15 episodes)

 Cracking the Ocean Code (1 January 2006)
 Discovering Language Arts: A Novel Idea (1 January 2007)
 Discovering Language Arts: Right Before Your Eyes (1 January 2007)
 Ice Age: Extreme Climate (1 January 2007)
 Discovering Language Arts: The Write Stuff (1 January 2007)
 American History: A Nation Is Born (1 January 2007)
 Exploring the Tales of Hans Christian Andersen (1 January 2007)
 Statistics and Data Analysis in Sports (1 January 2007)
 American History: Rise of the 20th Century (1 January 2007)
 Discovering Language Arts: The Moral of the Story (1 January 2007)
 Discovering Language Arts: We Proudly Present (1 January 2007)
 Elements of Physics: Wave Phenomena (1 January 2007)
 Hans Christian Andersen and the Elements of a Story (1 January 2007)
 American History: Marching Into the Future (1 January 2007)
 Natural Disasters (1 January 2007)

References

External links

Living people
People from Long Island
American voice actresses
Year of birth missing (living people)
American film actresses
American musical theatre actresses
American stage actresses
American television actresses
21st-century American women